Sarajevo Canton Regional Representation in Brussels is a member of Assembly of European Regions and has a mission to promote and lobby political, economic and business interests of Sarajevo Canton toward the European institutions and among other regions and private stake holders. The Representation Office in Brussels was founded in 2007.
Its goal is development and improvement of international cooperation of Sarajevo Canton with European Regions and cities as well with the various European associations with the objective of enhancing of the policy of the interregional, cross border cooperation of Sarajevo Canton.

The Office
The Representation Office in Brussels is in Rue du Commerce, in the same building of three other Regional Representations: Istria, Friuli Venezia Giulia and Carinthia.

The Head of the Representation
Dino Elezović has been the representative of Sarajevo Canton in Brussels since 2007.

The activities
In 2012, in occasion of the Open Days the 10th European Week of Regions and Cities in Brussels, Sarajevo Canton and the Slovenian MEP Jelko Kacin hosted a political round table named "The perspectives of Croatian Accession to the EU for the future of EU integration process and regional co-operation".
Organizations related to the European Union
Sarajevo Canton
Bosnia and Herzegovina–European Union relations